Genius is a 2018 Indian Tamil-language drama film  directed by Suseenthiran and produced by the actor Roshan who also stars. It features newcomers. It has cinematography by R. B. Gurudev and music by Yuvan Shankar Raja with lyrics by Vairamuthu.  The movie examines the after effects that arise from the unwanted academic pressure that parents put on their children.

Plot
Genius is the story of how the childhood pressures on overachieving in studies impact a person's life, rendering him socially awkward and stressed. The movie explores the brain freeze of an IT employee named Dhinesh (Roshan) and gives us a glimpse into his childhood and teenage life and explores what led to the current breakdown.

Dhinesh's school life is shown to be a normal one, spending happy times at his grandparents' place in a beautiful village; until his potential as a genius is highlighted by the school principal at the school's annual day. From there, Dhinesh's father Ramamoorthy (Aadukalam Naren) takes it upon himself to push Dhinesh to the limits and make the world applaud for him. To this end, Dhinesh is taken from class to class from morning until dusk. All other social contacts, playtimes, and fun activities are shunned as distractions.

The next happy memory that Dinesh remembers is the lovely friendship in his teens with a beautiful and smart girl named Priscilla. When Priscilla upstages Dhinesh in studies, Ramamoorthy puts an ugly end to it too, making Dhinesh lonely forever.

Aided by the doctor (Jayaprakash), Dhinesh's parents embark on a mission to cure Dhinesh of schizophrenia using various methods. If Dhinesh will be cured and how he will be cured form the rest of the story.

Cast

Production
In January 2018, Suseenthiran announced that he would be directing a film called Genius while also filming another project, Champion. Newcomer Roshan portrays the lead role and also produced the film. Suseenthiran revealed that he had written this script with Vijay in mind; however, since he did not agree to do the film, a debutant was chosen for the plot. The film is based on the theme of education and mental stress.

Soundtrack
Suseenthiran again collaborated with Yuvan Shankar Raja, who had composed music for the director's earlier films, Naan Mahaan Alla, Rajapattai and Aadhalal Kadhal Seiveer. Vairamuthu wrote all of the lyrics. One of the songs in the film, "Neengalum Oorum", is sung by Shrikanth (Super Singer). The audio tracks were produced by Yuvan's U1 Records label.
The list of songs.

Reception
Sify wrote "The biggest problem with Genius is that we cannot relate with the protagonist, his issues and the manner in which it is dealt. Suseenthiran wanted to talk about a serious issue but the way in which he has dealt the issue is insensitive and illogical." Times of India called it "A message film filled with convoluted, preposterous scenes". India Today called it "In a nutshell, Genius starring Roshan and Priya Lal is a shoddy film that fails to rise above the ordinary". The Hindu wrote "In Genius, Susienthiran seems completely clueless about the story and its milieu".

References

External links
"Aamir Khan film PK inspires director Suseenthiran to make Genius", India Today, 21 August 2018
Genius on IMDB

Films scored by Yuvan Shankar Raja
2010s Tamil-language films
2018 films
Films directed by Suseenthiran
Films about the education system in India